Piyo Blocks is an iOS game developed by British studio Big Pixel Studios, which was released on October 12, 2009. A sequel, Piyo Blocks 2, was released on July 8, 2010.

Gameplay
The aim of the game is to swap Piyo Blocks that are adjacent to each other in order to create three of the same type in a row.

Critical reception

Piyo Blocks
Gamezebo gave it 4/5 stars, writing "There’s a lot of life in Piyo Blocks’ graphics and gameplay—enough to give you pause if you're looking for a distraction. This is a game that demands your full attention." SlideToPlay rated it 3 out of 4, writing "For those who are not yet burned out from the Match-3 genre, Piyo Blocks is a polished gem for the $0.99. The lack of online leaderboards does hurt its value, however, so some may want to fly, fly away." Creative applications said "Adopting wonderful pixel art style graphics with subtle but very effective animations and although quite similar to Bejeweled, it nevertheless feels like a new experience. In other words if you are fan and love pixel art, it’s the one for you."

Piyo Blocks 2
Piyo Blocks 2 has a rating of 90% on Metacritic based on 4 critic reviews.

SlideToPlay said "Piyo Blocks 2 adds more content and an excellent multiplayer mode, propelling it far past its predecessor and many of its competitors." AppSafari said " Usually match-3 games inspire about as much excitement in me as using a can opener, but I was utterly delighted and hooked by Piyo Blocks 2. Get this game. I mean it. It's even on sale right now for a mere $0.99, so go and get it already! " 148Apps wrote " With very rich, vibrant colors and some solid match 3 game play, Piyo Blocks 2 is a great game for anyone looking for a challenge. " PocketGamerUK said "In a genre as packed to the gills as the match-three puzzler, Piyo Blocks 2 stands out by doing the simple things extraordinarily well."

References

2009 video games
Android (operating system) games
IOS games
Puzzle video games
Video games developed in the United Kingdom